Florent Robidoux (born May 5, 1960) is a Canadian retired professional ice hockey player. He played in 52 National Hockey League games with the Chicago Black Hawks between 1980 and 1984. At the time, Florent had played in every IHL, AHL, and NHL arena.

Career statistics

Regular season and playoffs

Awards
 WHL First All-Star Team – 1980

External links

1960 births
Living people
Canadian ice hockey forwards
Chicago Blackhawks players
Estevan Bruins players
Hershey Bears players
Ice hockey people from Manitoba
Milwaukee Admirals (IHL) players
New Brunswick Hawks players
New Westminster Bruins players
Portland Winterhawks players
Springfield Indians players
Undrafted National Hockey League players